This is a list of the orders and decorations of the Principality of Serbia (1804 – 1882).

Orders 
 Order of the Cross of Takovo (5 Classes)

Medals 
 Silver Medal for Bravery 1876
 Medal for Bravery 1877 – 1878 (Gold and Silver Classes)
 Distinguished Service Medal 1876 – 1878 (Gold and Silver Classes) 
 Distinguished Service Medal for "aiding wounded and ailing soldiers for the 1876 and 1877 – 1878 wars" aka Princess Natalia Medal (Gold and Silver Classes)
 Order of the Serbian Red Cross Society

Commemorative medals 
 Commemorative Memorial Medal for the 1876 and 1877 – 1878 wars

References

External links 

Orders, decorations, and medals of the Principality of Serbia
Principality of Serbia